Savitaipale (literally translated the "clay passage") is a municipality of Finland. It is located in the South Karelia region.

The bastionné line of the coat of arms refers to Savitaipale's position as a border keeper in the period between the Treaty of Åbo concluded in 1743 and the border review carried out in 1812. The plough in the coat of arms refers to the local agriculture in the region. The coat of arms was designed by Viljo Savikurki, and the Savitaipale municipal council approved it on January 2, 1953. The Ministry of the Interior approved the coat of arms for use on March 3 of the same year.

People
 Jonni Myyrä (1892–1955)
 Päivi Tikkanen (born 1960)
 Taneli Tikka (born 1978)

See also
 "Savitaipaleen polkka" — also known as "Ievan polkka"

References

External links

Municipality of Savitaipale – Official website
goSaimaa.com – travel information

 
Populated places established in 1639
1639 establishments in Sweden